Pablo Darío López (born 1982-06-04 in Lomas de Zamora) is an Argentine football midfielder his currently playing for Deportivo Español in the Primera C Metropolitana.

Career
This player played in teams for Deportivo Español, C.A.I., Deportivo Cuenca, San Martín de Tucumán, Chacarita Juniors and Santiago Wanderers.

Pablo López is one of the stars of Santiago Wanderers with Joel Soto, Moisés Villarroel, Rodrigo Barra and Eric Godoy their football is very skillful, agile and mind which led to playing in total 29 official games for the club and 14 goals officials in tournaments.

Club history
 Deportivo Español 1998-2003
 C.A.I. 2003
 Deportivo Cuenca 2004
 San Martín de Tucumán 2004-2006
 Chacarita Juniors 2006-2007
 San Martín de Tucumán 2007-2008
 Santiago Wanderers 2008–2011
 Huracán 2011-2012
 Banfield 2012-2013
 San Martín (SJ) 2013-2014
 Audax Italiano 2014-2016
 Deportivo Español 2016-

Titles

External links
Profile at BDFA
 
 

1982 births
Living people
Argentine footballers
Argentine expatriate footballers
Association football midfielders
Audax Italiano footballers
Club Atlético Banfield footballers
Comisión de Actividades Infantiles footballers
Chacarita Juniors footballers
Club Atlético Huracán footballers
Deportivo Español footballers
San Martín de San Juan footballers
Santiago Wanderers footballers
Chilean Primera División players
Primera Nacional players
Primera B Metropolitana players
Primera C Metropolitana players
Expatriate footballers in Chile
Expatriate footballers in Ecuador
People from Lomas de Zamora
Sportspeople from Buenos Aires Province